A Very Curious Girl is a 1969 French comedy-drama film directed, edited and co-written by Nelly Kaplan.
 Other English titles are Dirty Mary and Pirate's Fiancée.

Plot 
Marie is a young woman who lives in sheer poverty in the fictional village and commune of Tellier (an allusion to La Maison Tellier) with her mother, a woman of obscure origins suspected to be a Romanichel sorcerer, and her pet buck. Marie and her mother are despised by the locals although Marie is also a sexual object for them, including her lesbian boss Irène. One day, when her mother dies after a hit-and-run accident and the locals do not even bother to bury her, Marie decides that things have to change and starts to charge people who have sex with her. Eventually, she plans to take revenge on those people who take advantage of her.

Cast 
 Bernadette Lafont as Marie
 Georges Géret as Gaston Duvalier, the village guard
 Michel Constantin as André, the projectionist  
 Julien Guiomar as the Duke
 Jean Parédès as Monsieur Paul, the herbalist
 Francis Lax as Émile, the commune council member
 Claire Maurier as Irène, Marie's boss
 Marcel Pérès as Grandpa
 Pascal Mazzotti : Abbé Dard
 Jacques Masson : Hippolyte Duvalier, Gaston's son
 Henry Czarniak : Julien, Irène's farmhand
 Jacques Marin : Félix Lechat, the café owner
 Micha Bayard : Mélanie « La Goulette » Lechat, Félix's wife 
 Fernand Berset : Jeanjean, the lingerie salesman
 Renée Duncan : Fifine (Delphine), Émile's wife 
 Gilberte Géniat : Rose, the Duke's wife
 Claire Olivier : Marie's mother
 Louis Malle : Jésus, the Duke's Spanish farmhand
 Claude Makovski : Victor, the shop owner

Score
Georges Moustaki's soundtrack was released in the same year as the film.
 Histoire du Cirque  (1:22) 
 Duo  (2:21)
 La Mort  (2:08)
 Pierre et Nicole (2:44)
 Thème de Franca  (1:37)
 A Lisbonne (fado) (1:37)
 Retour à L'hôtel (2:18)
 Le Scandale / Suite (11:40)
 Mona  (1:31)
 Anne et Claude au Musée  (2:27)
 Le Désespoir de Muriel  (3:52)
 La Déclaration d'Amour  (2:25)
 La Rupture  (3.46)
 Epilogue  (2:25)
 Une Petite Ile  (1:30)
 Anne et Claude  (2:05)
 Moi, Je Me Balance  (2:46)
 Marche de Marie (2:35)

Critical reception
The New York Times listed A Very Curious Girl as one of Bernadette Lafont's most notable films. The website filmfanatic.org  put this film into the category "Foreign Gem". 
 The Guardian mentions "A curious girl" in her obituary and states Lafont's performance had been "brilliant".

References

External links 
 
 
 

1969 films
1969 comedy-drama films
French comedy-drama films
1960s French-language films
Films shot in France
Films about prostitution in France
1960s French films